The canton of Moulins-2 is an administrative division of the Allier department, in central France. It was created at the French canton reorganisation which came into effect in March 2015. Its seat is in Moulins.

It consists of the following communes: 
 
Bert 
Bessay-sur-Allier
Chapeau
Châtelperron
Chavroches
Cindré
La Ferté-Hauterive
Gouise
Jaligny-sur-Besbre
Liernolles
Mercy
Montbeugny
Moulins (partly)
Neuilly-le-Réal 
Saint-Gérand-de-Vaux
Saint-Léon
Saint-Voir
Sorbier
Thionne
Toulon-sur-Allier
Treteau
Trézelles
Varennes-sur-Tèche

References

Cantons of Allier